GMA News TV (GNTV; visually rendered in its logo in all capital letters as GMA NEWS TV) is a 24-hour Philippine-based international pay television channel owned by Citynet Network Marketing and Productions Inc., a wholly owned subsidiary of GMA Network Inc. Originally launched in the Philippines on February 28, 2011 as a domestic free-to-air television network replacing  QTV. It launched an international pay television channel (GMA News TV International) in the latter part of 2011. 

GMA News TV ended its Philippine broadcast operations on February 22, 2021 to give way to GTV. GMA News TV International was renamed to GMA News TV and continues to broadcast.

History
GMA News TV was created as a replacement for "Q", a network which primarily featured imported dramas and lifestyle-oriented programming aimed towards women, and as part of GMA News and Public Affairs's plans to expand its presence on free-to-air television. GMA News TV was unveiled on February 7, 2011 through GMA-7's flagship newscast 24 Oras, and Q was discontinued on February 20, 2011, in preparation for the launch of the new service, which occurred on February 28, 2011.

Until 2019, ZOE Broadcasting Network served as an originating affiliate and flagship station of GMA News TV, as a result of a blocktime lease agreement between ZOE Broadcasting and GMA's subsidiary Citynet Network Marketing and Productions in 2005, allowing the latter to lease the entire airtime of DZOE-TV 11 Manila, in exchange for upgrading the former's facilities and an off-peak timeslot for its programs on Channel 11 and GMA Network. However, due to increasing lease payments of GMA Network to ZOE Broadcasting which is accompanied with decreased revenues of GMA, the two networks announced on April 24, 2019 that they will terminate the agreement by the end of May 2019. As a result, GMA News TV Manila was reassigned to analog Channel 27, which was being used for digital test broadcast of GMA Network, on June 4. In turn, DTV operations of GMA were transferred on a permanent frequency, UHF Channel 15 (479.143 MHz), which was being used since May 15.

On July 27, 2019, GMA News TV premiered its first and only English language news broadcast GMA Regional TV Weekend News (now Regional TV Weekend News) before switching to Filipino since September 12, 2020.

In line with the enhanced community quarantine imposed due to the COVID-19 pandemic outbreak, GMA News TV temporarily went off air on March 19, 2020 and has returned on air on March 21, 2020 with limited broadcasting hours. On April 13, 2020, the channel resumed its regular primetime programming after 24 Oras, with its full programming restored by September 21.

Programming changes and rebranded as GTV
On November 21, 2020, an article was published by its affiliate news portal Sports Interactive Network, GMA Network announced plans for a possible reformat of GMA News TV into a sports and entertainment channel which is to be similar to the old format of Citynet Television and QTV. The plans were unveiled following GNTV's gradual shift away from its original news channel format and towards general entertainment and sports since September 2020, which includes acquisition of broadcast rights to NCAA and PSL games, a simulcast of its sister digital channel Hallypop, and additional entertainment programs from its mother station GMA Network due to increase of its commercial load. This changes drew negative reactions by viewers, where news coverages were put on hold for entertainment programs, notably when the Philippines were hit by Typhoon Goni (Rolly).

On February 9, 2021, the network announced that GMA News TV will be rebranded as GTV on February 22, less than a week to the day GNTV was launched a decade ago.

To reflect the change, GMA News TV's presentation was dramatically overhauled on February 22, 2021, it was replaced by GTV, the channel also featured to news, entertainment and sports programs.

The "GMA News TV" brand has since been used for by the international channel, with the word International being dropped after 10 years.

Final programming

Most of GMA News TV's programming consisted of news and public affairs programs produced by GMA News and Public Affairs. Outside of its core programming, the channel aired entertainment programs including lifestyle, cooking shows, talk shows, local and foreign drama, comedy and reality series, travel, foreign animated series, local and foreign movie blocks, sports programs and additional programming produced by GMA.

Availability

GMA News TV was seen via regular free-to-air television on Channel 27 in Metro Manila, Cebu and Davao and other 28 regional stations nationwide. Aside from GNTV's main analog signal, it was a must-carry channel on all cable and satellite TV providers nationwide. This channel was also available as a digital subchannel through GMA's main digital transmitters in Metro Manila, Baguio, Batangas, Cebu, and Davao.

GMA News TV International

Later in 2011, GMA Network would also launch a 24-hour international version called GMA News TV International to complement its two other international channels (GMA Pinoy TV and GMA Life TV).  Unlike its domestic counterpart, programs on GMA News TV International air tape-delayed (except for selected special events such as live coverage of Day 1 of Eleksyon 2013) and the timepiece on the lower-left hand side of the screen is covered.

It began to be offered as a preview channel in Australia on FetchTV, IPS/AccessTV in Japan, GUdTV in Guam, Zuku TV in Kenya and on OSN, with an official launch planned for the third quarter of 2011.

GMA News TV International was officially launched on UBI World TV on December 1, 2011. In May 2012, Canadian IPTV provider MTS TV added GMA News TV International, becoming its first Canadian carrier. In November 2012, Optik TV added the channel to their lineup. Additionally, GMA News TV international is now also available in Singtel TV in SD. GMA News TV International was officially launched on Starhub TV in January 2019 along with GMA Pinoy TV and GMA Life TV.

In Hong Kong, GMA News TV International was launched through Now TV in June 2015.

In Europe, Australia and New Zealand, GMA News TV International (along with GMA's other international channels) is available through over-the-top streaming service Lyca TV.

Despite the rebranding of GMA News TV as GTV on February 22, 2021 in the Philippines, the international version will continue using its name afterwards.

See also
 Citynet Network
 List of television stations in the Philippines
 GTV

References

GMA News TV
Filipino-language television stations
Television networks in the Philippines
Defunct television networks in the Philippines
Television channels and stations established in 2011
Television channels and stations disestablished in 2021
Peabody Award winners
Cable television in the United States
International broadcasters
Direct broadcast satellite services
GMA International
Filipino diaspora
International broadcasting
24-hour television news channels in the Philippines
2011 establishments in the Philippines
GMA Network (company) channels
ZOE Broadcasting Network